Leland may refer to:

Places

United States
 Leland, Illinois, a village
 Leland, Iowa, a city
 Leland, Michigan, an unincorporated community and census-designated place
 Leland, Mississippi, a city
 Leland, North Carolina, a town
 Leland, Oregon, an unincorporated community
 Leland, Utah, an unincorporated community
 Leland, Washington, an unincorporated community
 Leland, Wisconsin, an unincorporated community
 Leland Township, Michigan
 Leland River, Michigan
 Leland Pond, New York

Elsewhere
 Leland, Norway, a village
 Mount Leland, Victoria Land, Antarctica

People

Given name
 Leland Austin (born 1986), American rapper under the stage name Yung L.A.
 Leland Bardwell (1922–2016), Irish poet, novelist and playwright
 Leland Chapman (born 1976), American bounty hunter on the reality television series Dog the Bounty Hunter
 Leland Christensen (1959–2022), American politician
 Leland D. Melvin (born 1964), American engineer and retired astronaut
 Leland Irving (born 1988), Canadian ice hockey goaltender 
 Leland Orser (born 1960), American actor
 Leland Palmer (actress) (born 1945), American actress, dancer, and singer 
 Leland Rayson (1921–2001), American lawyer and politician
 Leland Sklar (born 1947), American bassist and session musician
 Leland Stanford (1824–1893), American industrialist and politician, founder of Stanford University, Governor of California
 Leland Stanford Jr. (1868–1884), namesake of Stanford University, only son of Leland Stanford
 E. Leland Taylor (1885–1948), mayor of Louisville, Kentucky
 Leland Wilkinson (1944–2021), American statistician and computer scientist
 Leland Yee (born 1948), former State Senator of California and convicted criminal

Surname
Note: Leland is a traditional Irish surname.

 Burton Leland (1948–2018), American social worker and businessman
 Charles Godfrey Leland, American humorist and folklorist
 David J. Leland, American politician from Ohio
 David Leland, British director, screenwriter and actor
 Evelyn Leland (c. 1870–c. 1930), American astronomer
 Frank Leland, Negro league baseball team owner of the Leland Giants
 Gabe Leland (born 1982), American politician
 George W. Leland, American Civil War Medal of Honor recipient
 Hayne Leland, economist
 Henry M. Leland, automotive pioneer and founder of Cadillac and Lincoln brands
 John Leland (antiquary), English antiquary
 John Leland (Baptist), United States Baptist minister
 John Leland (journalist), reporter, columnist, and book author
 John Leland (politician), English Member of Parliament for Stamford, 1796–1808
 John Leland (Presbyterian), English Presbyterian minister
 John E. Leland, American engineer and Director of the University of Dayton Research Institute 
 Mabel Johnson Leland (1871-1947), American lecturer, translator 
 Mickey Leland, United States Congressman from Texas
 Sara Leland, American ballet dancer and répétiteur
 Sherman Leland, President of the Massachusetts Senate
 Simeon Leland, American businessman, hotelier
 Thomas Leland, Irish historian
 Waldo Leland, American historian and archivist

Stage name
 Leland (musician) (real name Brett Leland McLaughlin; born 1991), American singer

Fictional characters
 Joe Leland, protagonist in The Detective novel (1966) and movie adaptation (1968)
 Lee Adama (Leland Joseph Adama), in the TV series Battlestar Galactica (2004)
 Leland Gaunt, in the Stephen King book Needful Things
 Leland Owlsley, a.k.a. Owl, a fictional Marvel Comics supervillain
 Leland Palmer, in the TV series Twin Peaks
 Leland Stottlemeyer, in the TV series Monk

Schools in the United States
 Leland College, a former college for blacks in New Orleans, Louisiana, on the National Register of Historic Places
 Leland High School (San Jose, California)
 Leland High School (Leland, Illinois)
 Leland High School (Leland, Mississippi)

Other uses 
 Leland Corporation, an arcade game manufacturer
 Leland Hotel (disambiguation)
 Leland Initiative

See also
 
 Leland I, a sculpture in Portland, Oregon
 Leland Trail, a footpath in Somerset, England
 Leeland (disambiguation)
 Leighland
 Lelan, a given name and surname
 Leyland (disambiguation)
 McLelan, a surname

English unisex given names